The Sir William Wallace Hotel is an historic pub in the suburb of Birchgrove on the Balmain Peninsula in the inner west region of Sydney, in the state of New South Wales, Australia.

The pub is one of a number of buildings which formed an integral part of the shipbuilding and industrial history of the local area.

History

The pub is named after Sir William Wallace, a 13th century knight and Scottish patriot, although the reasons for choosing the name are not known. The close proximity to Mort's Dock and later Balmain Colliery ensured early patronage. The pub is now frequented by locals to whom it is affectionately known as the "Willie Wallace" or "Willie Wallie".

A mural depicting pub life, complete with regular patrons, was painted on an internal wall in 1995. The mural contains an image of actor Mel Gibson who provided perhaps the best known account of the life of William Wallace in the 1995 film Braveheart. A signed poster from the film also hangs on the wall in the main bar.

Architecture

The pub is a heritage-listed building of local significance built in the Victorian Filigree style. It is a two-storeyed corner hotel with a panelled lace upper verandah, timber posts to street and iron lace balustrades. It is a rare example of a hotel still in its original state.

Use as a filming location
The pub has been used as the location for a number of Australian films and television shows including the 1975 feature film Caddie, starring Helen Morse and Jack Thompson; the 1994 film The Sum of Us; and, in 2001, for an episode of the UK series The Bill.

See also

 List of public houses in Australia

References

 Nicholls, D; Baglin, D; Clarke, G; Around Balmain, The Balmain Association, 1986, .

Pubs in Sydney
Hotel buildings completed in 1879
Hotels established in 1879
1879 establishments in Australia
Inner West
Birchgrove, New South Wales